Inequality in the United States may refer to:

 Educational inequality in the United States
 Gender inequality in the United States
 Health inequality in the United States
 Racial inequality in the United States

Economic 
Income inequality in the United States
 Causes of income inequality in the United States

 Tax policy and economic inequality in the United States
 Wealth inequality in the United States

See also 
 Socioeconomic mobility in the United States